Old Bella Bella, also known as Old Towns or Qlts, was the name for the Heiltsuk village that grew up around the Hudson's Bay Company's historic Fort McLoughlin, at McLoughlin Bay on Campbell Island. The village relocated to the present site of Bella Bella, British Columbia by 1903. Today the Heiltsuk control the site, which houses a BC Ferries terminal, fish plant, and two houses, as well as archaeological remains of the old village.

Located on Campbell Island opposite the modern town now carrying the name Shearwater, the village grew and the Hudson's Bay Company closed the fort and replaced their operations with steam-ships. William Fraser Tolmie a Scottish doctor and fur trader employed by the Hudson's Bay Company left a record of some of his time at the fort and observed the development of the Heiltsuk village there.

Early history
The Heiltsuk village of Old Bella Bella (then simply Bella Bella) grew up adjacent to Fort McLoughlin, the Hudson's Bay Company trading fort at McLoughlin Bay. The fur trade employee, and later politician William Fraser Tolmie worked at Fort McLoughlin and wrote about his experiences in his book Physician and Fur Trader, providing interesting insights to the history.

The Fort closed in 1843. One report says that the Heiltsuk burned the abandoned fort for the iron;

A few years after the fort was abandoned, the Hudson's Bay Company had a change of mind and opened a store on the site of the former fort. They operated the store until deciding to lease it out, which they did in May 1883.

The community grew from the original group that had first built next to the fort.

The Heiltsuk population was ravaged by the 1862 Pacific Northwest smallpox epidemic.

During the late 1800s other Heiltsuk leaders brought their people together at Old Bella Bella;

1880-1900
The village changed significantly during the latter part of the 1800s, with European influence driving some of the change. A missionary account of the village in 1898 describes it;

Several traditional bighouses also existed in the village. A set of house posts was collected from one of these houses and is now located in the Brooklyn Museum.

By 1897 the Heiltsuk had decided to relocate the community.

The community continued to grow and a store was built in the community. - which also included a post office which used the name "Bella Bella" from 1930 to 1991 until changed to Old Bella Bella when the newer settlement across the strait was renamed Bella Bella after being Waglisla from 1974 to 1993.

When the store at McLoughlin Bay closed, the postal service, along with the name "Bella Bella" was transferred, first to a cannery, then to Shearwater, British Columbia.

The name "Old Bella Bella" is sometimes applied to both the original village at McLoughlin Bay, to the old post office in the "BC Packers Cannery" (now closed) on Lama Pass, and to Shearwater. For many years Shearwater used the name "Bella Bella" until it was recently transferred to the Heiltsuk village of Bella Bella (also known as Waglisla).

The name "Bella Bella" was initially applied to the Heiltsuk village located at McLoughlin Bay but when the store (and associated post office) closed the name was transferred to Denny Island, first at the cannery, then to Shearwater on Denny Island, British Columbia, which is now known as Shearwater, was known as Bella Bella Airbase from 1948 to 1952 and though renamed to Shearwater, the Bella Bella post office stayed at that location

Today the town "Bella Bella" refers to "New Bella Bella". The post office "Bella Bella" has now been returned to Campbell Island and the Heiltsuk village.

There are a number of resorts and hotels that are located on Denny Island such as the Shearwater Resort, the Denny Island B&B and the Whiskey Cove B&B. Most of Bella Bella's residents live on Campbell Island (New Bella Bella) but some employees of the Shearwater Resort still live on Denny Island.

Old Bella Bella today
The site now contains a fish processing plant and BC Ferries terminal - McLoughlin Bay, which includes a 'roll-on-roll-off' ramp allowing vehicles access.  In addition are several houses, a paved road connecting to the village of Bella Bella, British Columbia.

See also
Heiltsuk Nation

References 

Populated places in the Central Coast Regional District